The VM-01 is a light helicopter from the Lada Land company in Tolyatti, Russia. The design was created privately by the company, but production was assisted by OKB Mil and Kamov.

Design
The aircraft contains a rotary-piston engine, four-bladed main rotor, two-bladed tail rotor, skid undercarriage, titanium alloys in the construction of the load system, and composite materials in the fuselage construction. The first flight was in May, 2001.

Specifications

References

External links

2000s Russian civil utility aircraft
2000s Russian helicopters
Aircraft manufactured in Russia